De Scene is a one-hour show which airs on Synergy TV in Trinidad and Tobago, hosted by Keisha Marie Charles. It is a music video countdown show which airs on weekdays at 6pm. Viewers are asked to text the codes of their favourite videos and this influences which videos will appear on the countdown and in what position. The videos that appear on De Scene are usually those of local and regional artists.

While hosting the video countdown, Keisha Marie Charles also visits places of interest in Trinidad and Tobago while interviewing local and regional celebrities, performers and members of the public during the taping of the countdown.

References

External links
 official website
 

Trinidad and Tobago television series